Hardley may refer to the following places in England:
 Hardley, Hampshire, a suburb of the village of Hythe near Southampton in Hampshire
 Hardley, Norfolk, in the parish of Langley with Hardley
 Hardley Flood, a Site of Special Scientific Interest on the north bank of the River Chet northeast of Loddon